Eial Strahman (Born 21 June 1989 in Córdoba), is an Argentine-Israeli footballer who plays for Maccabi Herzliya, as a forward.

Strahman was considered one of River Plate's best talents to come through the youth system and is nicknamed "The Monster" for his aggressive instincts. He is a left-footed striker and of Jewish heritage, having represented Argentina at the 2005 Maccabiah Games.

Club career
Strahman began through the youth ranks of Talleres de Córdoba, before moving to Vélez Sársfield, where he was the top scorer with 42 goals in 50 appearances for the youth team.

River Plate
Following his successful season at Vélez for the youth team, he joined River Plate, with Velez entitled to 40 per cent of any future transfer fee to a European club.  Strahman made a strong start to his career at River Plate, scoring eight goals in his first five matches for the River Plate reserves.  He was also an unused substitute in several of River Plate's final matches of the 2008-09 season.
Strahman acquired the nickname "twitter" from his teammates because he is an avid user of this social network. Also, is rumored that he received a suspension for offending a referee in a tweet during a reserve match. This also lead to the decision to delete his account, but the name still prevailed.

Maccabi Haifa
Strahman signed with the Israeli champions just days after they had qualified for the UEFA Champions League with an aggregate win over Austrian team Red Bull Salzburg. His debut match for Haifa did not come though until 23 September 2009 in a Toto Cup match against Hapoel Petah Tikva. Strahman failed to make an impact on the match though and was substituted out in the 55th minute.

With the opening of the January transfer window, Maccabi Haifa released Strahman to Argentine club, Instituto.

Return to Argentina
On 6 February 2010, Eial Strahman made his debut for Instituto, coming on for Javier Correa in a league match against Independiente Rivadavia. A week later he got his first start against C.A.I. For the 2010–11 season, Strahman joined Argentinos Juniors, the reigning champion of the Argentine Primera División.

Mexico
On August 30, 2012, Strahman joined Club Universidad de Guadalajara in the Mexican Ascenso MX, the second-tier league on a one-year contract. After only starting two games in the Apertura 2012, he became key in the team's impressive unbeaten run in the first half of Clausura 2013, where he scored 7 goals in 8 games.

Spain
On 30 June 2013, Strahman signed with Córdoba CF in Segunda División, the Spanish second-tier.

Return to Israel
Strahman scored a goal for Sektzia Ness Ziona in a practice match in May 2020. Given the lack of other football being played, this goal made news in Argentina.

On 5 November 2020 loaned to the Liga Alef club Hapoel Bik'at HaYarden.

International career
Strahman's international allegiance has not been decided yet, as he is eligible to play for both Argentina, his country of birth, and Israel.  Strahman's father, Julio, spent ten years living in Israel from 1975 to 1985, and said of his son's international aspirations, "I have brought up my children to see Israel as their future home."  Eial himself has said "I look forward to a future opportunity to play for Israel", but also remarked that "I think I am good enough to play for Argentina one day".

In May 2009, Strahman was called up to represent the Israel national under-21 football team in a European qualifier against Bulgaria, however his club refused to release him for the match, saying that he would be needed for the first team in June.

Statistics 
Updated February 4, 2016

Notes and references

External links
 River Plate - Player profile
 
 
 

1989 births
Living people
Footballers from Córdoba, Argentina
Argentine Jews
Argentine footballers
Israeli footballers
Israeli expatriate footballers
Jewish Argentine sportspeople
Jewish footballers
Argentine emigrants to Israel
Israeli people of Argentine-Jewish descent
Sportspeople of Argentine descent
Association football forwards
Club Atlético River Plate footballers
Instituto footballers
Maccabi Haifa F.C. players
Argentinos Juniors footballers
C.S. Emelec footballers
Ferro Carril Oeste footballers
Leones Negros UdeG footballers
Córdoba CF players
C.F. Mérida footballers
Talleres de Córdoba footballers
Olimpo footballers
Independiente Rivadavia footballers
Club Almagro players
Sektzia Ness Ziona F.C. players
Hapoel Bik'at HaYarden F.C. players
Maccabi Herzliya F.C. players
Argentine Primera División players
Israeli Premier League players
Primera Nacional players
Torneo Federal A players
Ecuadorian Serie A players
Segunda División players
Competitors at the 2005 Maccabiah Games
Expatriate footballers in Ecuador
Expatriate footballers in Mexico
Expatriate footballers in Spain
Israeli expatriate sportspeople in Mexico
Israeli expatriate sportspeople in Ecuador
Israeli expatriate sportspeople in Spain
Argentine expatriate sportspeople in Mexico
Argentine expatriate sportspeople in Ecuador
Argentine expatriate sportspeople in Spain